Abigail Shapiro may refer to:

Abigail Shapiro, American YouTube personality and sister of Ben Shapiro
Abigail Shapiro, American actress and sister of Milly Shapiro, also known as Abi Monterey